Flotilla Service Act was a United States federal statute passed on April 16, 1814 preceding the British Royal Navy blockade of the New England Colonies commencing on April 25, 1814. The public law established a temporary Mid-Atlantic naval auxiliary service for amphibious operations orchestrated by the Chesapeake Colonies during the War of 1812. The Chesapeake Bay Flotilla conducted amphibious maneuvers in low-level tidal creeks seeking to deter the territorial headway of the British Royal Navy offensive into the Chesapeake Bay tributaries. The Act of Congress authorized appropriations for the federal law in response to the foreseeable onslaught by the British Army redcoats arson offensive on August 24, 1814 at Washington City better known as the Burning of Washington.

Provisions of the Act   

The Thirteenth United States Congress drafted public law 13-59 as three sections providing a manpower formulation which coincided with the military objectives discharged by the Colonial American counter-offensive naval flotilla forces.

Chapter LIX § 1: Appointment of Flotilla Officers
 Four captains
 Twelve lieutenants
 Officers employed in the flotilla service of the United States, without rank in the Navy, but with the same relative rank and authority in the flotilla service as officers of the same grade are entitled to in the Navy of the United States.
Chapter LIX § 2: Pay and Emoluments
 Captains shall receive the pay and subsistence of a captain in the Navy commanding a ship of twenty and under thirty-two guns.
 Lieutenants shall receive the same pay as officers of the same rank are entitled to in the Navy of the United States, and shall be governed by the rules and regulations provided for the government of the Navy.
Chapter LIX § 3: Authorization of Presidential Appointments
 It shall be lawful for the President of the United States to appoint, in the recess of the Senate, any of the officers authorized by this act, which appointments shall be submitted to the Senate at their next session.

Abolishment of the Flotilla Service Act
On the tenth day after the ratification of the Treaty of Ghent, Flotilla Service Act of 1814 was repealed by the United States 13th Congressional session occurring on February 27, 1815.

See also

British Royal Military Commanders During the 1814 Washington Offensive

Chesapeake Bay River Tributaries

References

Reading Bibliography

External links
 
 
 
 
 
 
 
 
 
 
 
 
 

1814 in American law
1814 in the United States
13th United States Congress
War of 1812